Canty may refer to:

As a surname
Canty (surname), a list of people
Tom Canty, the pauper in the novel The Prince and the Pauper by Mark Twain

Places
Canty, Alabama, U.S., place in Alabama
Canty Bay, small inlet and coastal hamlet on the northern coast of East Lothian, Scotland
Canty Point, on the Antarctic Peninsula
Canty House, Kanawha County, West Virginia, United States

See also
Canti (disambiguation)